Cedar Beach is a public beach on Jones Beach Island, a barrier island in the Town of Babylon, in Suffolk County, New York.   There are no residents.

Access to the beach is via the Ocean Parkway. Parking is available during the week for residents with parking permits. You may also pay the daily $20 fee ($30 on weekends).

Cedar beach features a marina, many children's parks, a trailer park, a fish museum, camps in the summer, children's activities, various entertainment, an annual summer fair, a volleyball league, shuttle service down to the ocean, and a snack shop.

External links
Cedar Beach (Town of Babylon)

Babylon (town), New York
Beaches of Suffolk County, New York
Protected areas of Suffolk County, New York